Phlya ( or Φλυά) was a deme of ancient Attica that lay in the Mesogaea. It must have been a place of importance from the number of temples which it contained, and from its frequent mention in inscriptions.

The site of Phlya is located near modern Chalandri.

References

Populated places in ancient Attica
Former populated places in Greece
Demoi